Giuseppe Angilella (born 27 August 1984) is an Italian sailor. He competed at the 2012 Summer Olympics in the 49er class, finishing ninth.

References

Giuseppe Angilella, Profile from site of Gill Race Team

External links

Living people
Olympic sailors of Italy
Italian male sailors (sport)
Sailors at the 2012 Summer Olympics – 49er
1984 births